Codium duthiae is a species of seaweed in the Codiaceae family.

It has a discoid holdfast with spongy erect fronds on terete branches.

It is found on coastal area with light to moderate water movement from the low tide mark to a depth of 

In Western Australia is found along the coast near Shark Bay extending down around the south coast. Its range extends around southern Australia to Victoria and northern Tasmania

References

duthiae
Plants described in 1956